Leon Dewan is an American artist, inventor, and musician.  He collaborates with Brian Dewan on Dewanatron, an electronic music instrument project.  The son of an inventor, Dewan received a degree in physics from Yale University in 1989.  His musical career draws on this background in physics, and heavily incorporates electronic and experimental instruments.

Dewan resides in New Rochelle, in Westchester County, New York.

Music 
Leon Dewan has performed and recorded music with several bands spanning over a decade.  Bands include Radeesh, The Happiest Guys in the World, Shaumgummi, Dangerspoon, Flaming Fire, and collaborative work with The Philistines Jr.  Dewan sings and plays a variety electronic instruments including electric guitar, the Theremin, and Dewanatron instruments.

Albums and collaborations
 The Happiest Guys in the World (as The Happiest Guys in the World) (1996)
 The Tarquin Records All Star Holiday Extravaganza (as The Happiest Guys in the World) (1997)
 Dewanatron (as Dewanatron) (2005)

Soundtracks
Shadowbox (2007)

Music Videos
Hey! Hey! It's the Vegetable Man! (as The Happiest Guys in the World)(1999) Directed by Paul Yates

The Happiest Guys in the World 
Dewan performed and recorded with the band The Happiest Guys in the World from 1991 through 2001.  The band's music video Hey! Hey! It's the Vegetable Man! was screened at the 2004 International Surrealist Film Festival.

Dewanatron 
Leon Dewan and his cousin Brian Dewan collaborate on Dewanatron, an electronic music instrument project.  The instruments have been performed and exhibited at the Pierogi 2000 gallery in Brooklyn in January 2006, Pierogi Leipzig (Germany) from April thru July 2006 and at Another Year in LA gallery as well as Steve Allen Theater in Los Angeles in August/September, 2007. In March 2010 Dewanatron performed at Town Hall in Manhattan opening for the Magnetic Fields.

References

External links
Dewanatron site which describes many of the Dewan cousins' recent musical inventions
IMDB page for the film Shadowbox, in which the Dewan cousins perform the musical score
Pierogi Review of installation and performances at Pierogi Gallery
Images of Dewanatron performing live at radio station WNYC

American musical instrument makers
Living people
Yale University alumni
Artists from New Rochelle, New York
Place of birth missing (living people)
Year of birth missing (living people)